The SanWild Wildlife Sanctuary is a  wildlife rehabilitation center and reserve in South Africa's Limpopo Province, located a few kilometers south of Leydsdorp, and near the western boundary of the Kruger National Park.

Fauna 
Rehabilitated animals include African leopard, cheetah, lion, impala, greater kudu, blue wildebeest, red hartebeest, waterbuck, common and mountain reedbuck, grey duiker, nyala, South African giraffe, plains zebra, steenbok, warthog, southern white rhino, aardvark, pangolin, hippo and African bush elephant.

The treated animals are often the victims of careless drivers or hunters and poachers, and in the case of rhinos are severely mutilated after being shot or darted. A pack of Cape wild dogs has been moved onto the reserve. The area is also home to many of the smaller predators such as serval, caracal and civet, while the Sanctuary also houses 10 lions rescued from South Africa's canned lion breeding and hunting industry.

SanWild is outspoken about its opposition to the unethical and cruel practices employed by hunters and hunting organisations, particularly in trophy hunting. As a result, SanWild has been criticised and many attempts have been made to destroy its credibility. The reserve itself has come under pressure from poachers, necessitating the formation of well-armed anti-poaching units of rangers and dogs, active on foot and vehicle patrols, and having to work day and night shifts, ambushing and apprehending poachers, and generally maintaining the integrity of the reserve.

History 
Louise Joubert, founder of the reserve, grew up on a grape farm next to the Olifants River in Namaqualand where she was first drawn to the local wildlife. She became involved in wildlife and conservation when planning a successful fund-raising campaign for the 'Rhino & Elephant Foundation' in South Africa in 1989. This exposure to the plight of black rhinos caused her to leave her career in advertising and move to Limpopo Province to “work with wild animals”.

Initially she was part of a game capture and relocation company, and she soon became aware of how the growing commercialisation of wildlife was leading to its callous exploitation. She was especially affected by the disregard for young orphaned animals, the injuries sustained during capture and the ensuing deaths, and she decided to take on the orphaned victims for hand-rearing. The emotional stress following on game capture after game capture, and seeing at first hand the suffering of relocated wildlife, soon caused her to leave the game relocation industry.

In 1998 she leased a small stretch of Lowveld with the option to purchase after 5 years, and in 2000 formed the SanWild Wildlife Trust, a registered South African wildlife charity and non-profit organisation. The considerable overheads demanded by emergency rescues, resource management and the running of the sanctuary, are partly covered by donations, accommodation offered to 10 guests housed in Bukisa Camp: a luxury styled safari tented camp.

Gallery

See also 
 Animal welfare and rights in South Africa
 Animal welfare organisations based in South Africa

References

External links 
 Louise Joubert photo albums
 Facebook
 Humane Society International Youtube video

Wildlife sanctuaries of South Africa